Vassilis Karapialis (born 13 June 1965) is a Greek retired footballer who played as an attacking midfielder for AEL, Olympiacos and the Greece national football team. He is considered as one of the best Greek midfielders of the 1990s.

Club career

Early years
Born in Ambelokipoi, Larissa Karapialis started off with street football and in 1979, aged 14, he joined Toxotis Larissa youth team where Giorgos Agorogiannis, later Karapialis's teammate at AEL, was also playing. After a year, in 1980, he moved to Toxotis first team. He made some exceptional appearances with Toxotis at Larissa Prefecture Amateur League and many Top League's clubs got interested for him. In 1984, OFI was paying Toxotis 2,1 million drahmas to sign him, but Karapialis did not want to leave his hometown and refused the transfer. He did an outstanding 1984–85 season with Toxotis, scoring 30 goals playing as a midfielder.

AEL
In the summer 1985 Karapialis was transferred to the then Cup winners, AEL for 1 million drahmas and he became very popular among the fans. Soon he had his own fan club watching him playing every single week, holding a "Karapialis, You Are Magic" banner. For the first two seasons, Karapialis was used mainly as a substitute. When he managed to become a basic player in 1987–1988 season, the club won their only league title in the club's history, with Karapialis being the MVP of the season, beeing the only club that is not based in one of the two biggest cities of the country, Athens and Thessaloniki. The next seasons were bad for club, as the club faced serious bankruptcy problems.

Olympiacos
In 1991 Karapialis signed forOlympiacos. He made his debut against AEK Athens, when Olympiacos won 4–2, thanks to a hat-trick by Oleg Protasov. He quickly became the leader of the Red-Whites, thanks to his aggression and agility. He won one Greek Cup in his first five seasons with Olympiacos, but the next four were outstanding winning four out of four Championships, another Cup and a Greek Super Cup. In May 2000, Karapialis announced his retirement from professional football. The same year, he was voted as the third-best Greek professional footballer (after 1979, when football became professional in Greece), after Vassilis Hatzipanagis and Dimitris Saravakos.

International career
Karapialis appeared in 21 matches for the senior Greece national football team from 1988 to 1994 and scored 2 goals.

He was not included on the 1994 FIFA World Cup Greece team. In response, he announced his retirement from the National team.

International

Scores and results list Greece's goal tally first, score column indicates score after each Karapialis goal.

After football
During his retirement as a footballer, he would work for Olympiacos, either as a scout or as a manager to the club's youth teams. He would become the owner of his football academy center in Chalandri, Athens.

On 5 June 2021, the Greek media announced his official return to AEL to be in charge of all its youth teams.

Honours

AEL
Alpha Ethniki: 1987–88

Olympiacos
Alpha Ethniki: 1996–97, 1997–98, 1998–99, 1999–2000
Greek Cup: 1991–92, 1998–99
Greek Super Cup: 1992

References

External links
similar to Pelé's style goal (video) (in Greek)
bio article in newsbeast.gr (in Greek)
bio article in apopsi24.gr (in Greek)
bio article in sport24.gr (in Greek)

1965 births
Living people
Footballers from Larissa
Greek footballers
Greece international footballers
Super League Greece players
Olympiacos F.C. players
Athlitiki Enosi Larissa F.C. players
Association football midfielders
Greek beach soccer players